Andrew Roland Rein (born March 11, 1958) is an American former wrestler who competed in the 1984 Summer Olympics, for the United States. Rein was born in Stoughton, Wisconsin. In 1984, he won the silver medal in the Freestyle Lightweight competition.

References

External links
 

1958 births
Living people
Wrestlers at the 1984 Summer Olympics
American male sport wrestlers
Olympic silver medalists for the United States in wrestling
People from Stoughton, Wisconsin
Medalists at the 1984 Summer Olympics
Pan American Games medalists in wrestling
Pan American Games gold medalists for the United States
Wrestlers at the 1979 Pan American Games
20th-century American people
21st-century American people